is a 2012 Japanese film directed by Yosuke Okuda.

Synopsis
A stoic drifter (Nao Omori) hiding out at his friend's nightclub in Tokyo after blunt manslaughter.

Cast
 Nao Ōmori as Katsutoshi
 Ken Mitsuishi as Seikichi
 Asami Usuda as Eriko
 Masaaki Akahori as Takeo
 Takahiro Miura as Umezo
 Yasushi Fuchikami as Takahiro

References

External links
  
 

2012 films
Films set in Tokyo
2010s Japanese films

ja:東京プレイボーイクラブ